Calotmul Municipality (Yucatec Maya: "place of two conjoined hills") is one of the 106 municipalities in the Mexican state of Yucatán containing (361.50 km2) of land and is located roughly  east of the city of Mérida.

History
There is no accurate data on when the town was founded, but during the conquest, it became part of the encomienda system and the first encomendero was Rodrigo Alvarez in 1549. Subsequent encomenderos included Nicolas del Puerto (1665), who was entrusted with 400 indigenous persons; Antonio de la Felguera Castillo (1710), who had charge over 584 natives; and Marco Ayala.

Yucatán declared its independence from the Spanish Crown in 1821, and in 1825 the area was assigned to the Tizimín Municipality. In 1988 it was confirmed as head of its own municipality.

Governance
The municipal president is elected for a three-year term. The town council has four councilpersons, who serve as Secretary and councilors of markets, parks and gardens, and cemeteries.

Communities
The head of the municipality is Calotmul, Yucatán. There are 17 populated areas of the municipality which include Pocobóch, Táhcabo and Yokdzonot Meneses. The significant populations are shown below:

Local festivals
Every year from 1 to 8 December the town celebrates a festival in honor of the Immaculate Conception.

Tourist attractions
 Church of Immaculate Conception, built in the seventeenth century
 Cenote Actun-Dzonot 
 Cenote Azúl 
 Cenote Baal-Kax 
 Cenote Bal-Che
 Cenote Chacal Has
 Cenote Chakah

References

Municipalities of Yucatán